Frito pie is a dish popular in the Midwestern, Southeastern, and Southwestern United States, whose basic ingredients are chili, cheese, and corn chips (traditionally Fritos). Additions can include salsa, refried beans, sour cream, onion, rice, or jalapeños. There are many variations and alternative names used by region. Frito pie can be prepared in a casserole dish, but an alternate preparation can be in a single-serve Fritos-type corn chip bag with various ingredients as toppings. In Mexico a similar type of dish is chilaquiles.

History
The exact origin of the frito pie is not completely clear.

The oldest known recipe using Fritos brand corn chips with chili was published in Texas in 1949. The recipe may have been invented by Daisy Doolin, the mother of Frito Company founder Charles Elmer Doolin and the first person to use Fritos as an ingredient in cooking, or by Mary Livingston, Doolin's executive secretary. The Frito-Lay company attributes the recipe to Nell Morris, who joined Frito-Lay in the 1950s and helped develop an official cookbook which included the Frito pie.

Charles Doolin and his Frito Company were early investors in Disneyland, which opened Casa de Fritos restaurant in Disneyland in 1955. "Frito Chili Pie" appears on the 1950s menu.

Another story claims that true frito pie originated only in the 1960s with Teresa Hernández, who worked at the Woolworth's lunch counter in Santa Fe, New Mexico. Her frito pie used homemade red chili con carne with cheddar cheese and onions, and was served in the bag, which was thicker in the 1960s than it is now.

Preparation
Frito pie is a simple dish: at its most basic, it is Fritos corn chips with beef chili as a topping. It was historically served right inside the chip bag, which is split down the middle; toppings typically include shredded cheese and chopped raw onion, and may also include additional items like sour cream and jalapeños.

Variations

Frito boats and walking tacos
Frito pies are sometimes referred to by the name walking taco or Frito boat, and can be made in a small, single-serving bag of corn chips, with chili, taco meat, chickpeas, pork rinds, pepitas, and many other varied ingredients, poured over the top. The combination can be finished with grated cheese, onions, jalapeños, lettuce, and sour cream, known as a Frito boat or walking taco in the Midwestern United States. In the Ohio Valley, and the Upper Midwest regions, this preparation is also commonly called taco-in-a-bag. ("Walking taco", is the more widespread term at least in the Midwest). In many parts of Southern California, they are known as "pepper bellies." Frito pies are popular at sports venues, fundraisers, bingos, open houses, state fairs, and with street vendors. The term Tostiloco comes from Tijuana, and is found in California. Another term is Doriloco, after Doritos.

Tostilocos/Dorilocos
In Mexico, a version of the dish is known as tostilocos or dorilocos ("crazy chips"). Consists of a bag of Tostitos (plain) or Doritos (usually nacho-cheese flavored) topped with cueritos, chopped vegetables like shredded carrot, cucumber, jícama, lime juice, Valentina hot sauce, chamoy, Tajín chili powder, salt, and "Japanese peanuts".

See also

Haystacks
Taco salad
Tamale pie
Tostilocos
Petro's Chili & Chips, a Knoxville, Tennessee-based fast food chain serving a frito pie variant first served at the 1982 World's Fair

References

External links

Texas Cooking Article
Cook the Book: Frito Pie
Shilcutt, Katharine. "The Frito Pie Is Not from Texas: Commence Pearl-Clutching...Now." Houston Press. Thursday October 13, 2011.

American snack foods
Casserole dishes
Chili con carne
Cuisine of the Southwestern United States
Frito-Lay
Mexican cuisine
New Mexican cuisine
Tex-Mex cuisine
Texan cuisine